O is the debut studio album by Irish musician Damien Rice, originally released on 1 February 2002, in Ireland and in the United Kingdom. The album is dedicated to Rice's friend Mic Christopher, who died of a head injury in 2001.

Background
Damien Rice was previously a member of the band Juniper, and upon its disbandment due to changes in creative direction, he took a sabbatical in rural Italy before returning to Ireland. He would meet with his second cousin, composer David Arnold who was impressed upon hearing Rice's songs and sent Rice's demo to music publishers to no success.  Frustrated, Arnold worked with Rice to set up recording equipment for a home studio to make the album independently. He describes receiving a $500 loan from his father that would be forgiven on completion of the album. The recording process included opera singers, Gregorian chants, and a heavy influence from Lisa Hannigan, at the time Rice's personal and professional partner.

Rice wanted to release the album without the backing of a major record label, believing if he signed such a deal it would compromise his future work, forcing him to move in directions he did not wish to. The album was released as "CD-sized hardcover book filled with personal artwork, lyrics, and photos." In 2003, it would get distribution support from Vector Records for the global release, a then-newly established label focused on independent artists.

He later described his motivation as wanting "to forget about everybody else and make the next record that we're making just for ourselves again, because there's something about being in a space where you're not thinking of other people. You're just in a moment creating music and emotion and in a space with people you feel comfortable with. And that for me is the essence of what it is that we've done and what it is we do."

Reception

O was released to critical and public acclaim in Europe and then globally. It peaked at number 8 on the UK Albums Chart, lasting 115 weeks on the chart, with two singles in the top 30 and "Cannonball" additionally peaking at number 9.

In 2003, it won the Shortlist Prize for Artistic Achievement in Music, a then-prestigious award for albums that had sold less than 500,000 copies, though it would eventually go on to receive gold certification in America.

The video for the song "Volcano" charted in the United States on VH1's Top 20 Video countdown in October 2003.

Legacy
In 2014, John Meagher of The Irish Independent described the album as, "one of the great Irish cultural success stories of the decade." In 2015, Donte Kirby of That Music Mag called it "an album that mined the vein of melancholy that comes from a relationship. If your partner just left you, if a close friend won’t pick up your calls or there’s an ache in your chest O might speak to you." In  2015, Paul Moore of Joe.IE describes the difficulty of retrospectively ranking tracks as "the whole record plays out as one incredibly atmospheric, haunting and immersive piece of music."

Use in other media
Songs from the album are frequently featured, including use in over 37 television series and movies, and as of recently as 2017.
"The Blower's Daughter" was featured in the trailer for the 2004 Mike Nichols film Closer, as well as in the film itself.
"Cold Water" was featured in the 2003 film I Am David, in the end credits of the 2005 film Stay, also in the end credits of the final episode of the 2014 television crime thriller Prey and in the opening and closing scene of The Girl in the Café. In addition, it was featured in the 2010 French movie Little White Lies. The first bars are used to open several different scenes in aforementioned Closer.
"Delicate" was featured in the opening episode of the 2014 television drama The Affair's second season, during the ending sequence of the third episode of House M.D's second season, and during the first season of Lost. In addition, it was featured in the episode "TKO" of Money Heist.

Track listing

Personnel
Damien Rice – vocals, piano, guitar, percussion, clarinet, production
Lisa Hannigan – backing vocals, lead vocals on "Silent Night" (hidden track), piano
Vyvienne Long – cello
Mark Kelly – electric guitar, production
Shane Fitzsimons – bass guitar
Tom Osander aka Tomo – percussion, drums
Caroline "Caz" Fogerty – djembe
Doreen Curran – mezzo-soprano vocals on "Eskimo"
Nicholas Dodd – conducting
Colm Mac Con Iomaire – violin
Conor Donovan – timpani, percussion
Jean Meunier – improvisation, piano

Charts

Weekly charts

Year-end charts

Release history
After the album's initial release and success, it was repackaged several times with additional material:
2003 – with bonus DVD
2003 – includes extended version of "Eskimo", which features "Woman Like a Man" from B-Sides, and brings the track's length to 21:42.
2004 – with extra track "Cannonball" (Remix)
2004 – double album pack: O and B-Sides
2005 – with extra tracks "Cannonball" (Remix) and "Unplayed Piano"
2018 – Deluxe and Standard vinyl editions, with 2 O "hidden" tracks and 4 B-Sides tracks

References

2002 debut albums
Albums produced by Damien Rice
Damien Rice albums
Vector Recordings albums
European Border Breakers Award-winning albums